Low Island is one of the Falkland Islands. It is near West Falkland, to its north,  in Byron Sound  It is between Carcass Island and Dunbar Island and to the west of Saunders Island. It is south of Sedge Island and north of the Byron Heights and Storm Mountain.

References

Islands of the Falkland Islands